The Congolese Alliance of Christian Democrats is a political party in the Democratic Republic of Congo. The party won 4 out of 500 seats in the parliamentary elections.

References

Christian democratic parties in Africa
Political parties in the Democratic Republic of the Congo